Kuzmanov is a Bulgarian surname. Notable people with the surname include:

Anton Kuzmanov (born 1918), Bulgarian footballer
Dimitar Kuzmanov (born 1993), Bulgarian tennis player

Bulgarian-language surnames
Patronymic surnames